Westhall is a village and civil parish in the East Suffolk district, in the county Suffolk, England about  north east of Halesworth,  south west of Brampton and  south of Beccles, close to the A145. The mid-2005 population estimate for Westhall parish was 390. Sotherton is located to the south east and Holton to the south west.

The village church, which dates from Norman times, is dedicated to St Andrew and is a Grade I listed building. Westhall has a village pub, the Racehorse Inn.

See also
List of Grade I listed buildings in Waveney

References

External links

Villages in Suffolk
Civil parishes in Suffolk
Waveney District